The 1908 Brown Bears football team represented Brown University as an independent during the 1908 college football season. Led by second-year head coach J. A. Gammons, Brown compiled a record of 5–3–1.

Schedule

References

Brown
Brown Bears football seasons
Brown Bears football